Thomas Samuel Angley (October 2, 1904 – October 26, 1952) was a Major League Baseball catcher for the Chicago Cubs in April 1929. He was a native of Baltimore, Maryland and attended Georgia Tech.

In Angley's career, he had 6 RBI in 16 at bats. In five games he was 4-for-16 (.250) with one double and two walks. He also handled 30 of 31 chances successfully in the field.

References

External links

1904 births
1952 deaths
Chicago Cubs players
Major League Baseball catchers
Baseball players from Baltimore